Adolph II may refer to:

 Adolph II de la Marck (Bishop) (1288–1344), Price-Bishop of Liège
 Adolph II of the Marck (died in 1347), Count of the Marck
 Adolph II, Count of Nassau-Wiesbaden-Idstein (1386–1426)
 Adolph II of Nassau (c. 1423 – 1475), Archbishop of Mainz
 Adolph II, Prince of Anhalt-Köthen (1458–1526)